The Colbys is an American prime time television soap opera that originally aired on ABC from November 20, 1985, to March 26, 1987. Produced by Aaron Spelling, it was a spin-off of Dynasty, which had been the highest rated series for the 1984–1985 U.S. television season. The Colbys revolves around another vastly wealthy, upper-class family, who are relatives by marriage of the Carringtons of Dynasty and who own a large multinational conglomerate. It stars Charlton Heston as billionaire Jason Colby, Barbara Stanwyck as his sister Constance, Stephanie Beacham as Jason's wife Sable, and John James and Emma Samms as their Dynasty characters Jeff Colby and Fallon Carrington. Designed to be bigger than the original show, The Colbys was ultimately a ratings disappointment, and was cancelled after two seasons and 49 episodes.

Series overview

Episodes

Season 1 (1985–86)

Season 2 (1986–87)

Ratings

References

External links
 The Colbys episode guide – UltimateDynasty.net
 The Colbys episode list – IMDb.com

List
Lists of soap opera episodes
Lists of American drama television series episodes